The 2018 24H GT Series powered by Hankook was the fourth season of the 24H Series with drivers battling for championship points and titles and the eleventh season since Creventic, the organiser and promoter of the series, organises multiple races a year. The races were contested with GT3-spec cars, GT4-spec cars, sports cars and 24H-Specials, like silhouette cars.

Calendar

Entry List

Race results
Bold indicates overall winner.

See also
24H Series
2018 24H TCE Series
2018 24H Proto Series
2018 Dubai 24 Hour

Notes

References

External links

2018 in motorsport
2018 in 24H Series